The Zealand Life Regiment was a Royal Danish Army infantry regiment. On 1 January 2001 it was disbanded and amalgamated into the Guard Hussar Regiment, which was moved from Næstved to Slagelse.

History
The Sjællandske Livregiment could trace its history back to 1614. The Regiment participated in the Northern Wars (1658–1660), Scanian War (1675–1679), Nine Years' War (1693), Great Northern War (1700), Great Northern War (1709–1720), Copenhagen (1801), First Schleswig War (1848–1850) and Second Schleswig War (1864). It was furthermore in foreign service during 1689–1698 and 1701–1714. The regimental flag had the battle honours Copenhagen 1659, Landskrona 1675, Dybbøl 1849, Isted 1850, and Dybbøl 1864.

From 1968 the regiment had one mechanised infantry battalion and two infantry battalions, in 1976 it was upgraded to four battalions, with one armoured battalion. From 1983 to 1996 the regiment had five battalions.

In 2001, three of the regiment's four battalions were merged into Gardehusarregimentet and the fourth was transferred to the Royal Life Guards.

Organisation
Disband units 
  1st battalion (I/SJLR), Mechanized infantry Battalion from 1968. (1961-2000)   
  2nd battalion (II/SJLR), Armoured Battalion from 1976. (1961-2000)  
  3rd battalion (III/SJLR), Infantry Battalion. (1961-2000)           
  4th battalion (IV/SJLR), Infantry Battalion. (1974-2000)
  5th battalion (V/SJLR), Infantry Battalion. (1983-1996)
  4th Brigade Staff Company/1st Zealand Brigade. (1961-2000)
  4th Anti-tank Company/1st Zealand Brigade. (1961-1983) 
  5th Anti-tank Company/2nd Zealand Brigade. (1974-1983)
  Zealandic Liferegiment Music Corps, (1976-2000)

Names of the regiment

Standards

References
 Lærebog for Hærens Menige, Hærkommandoen, marts 1960

Danish Army regiments
1614 establishments in Denmark
Military units and formations established in 1614
Military units and formations disestablished in 2001